Phi Kappa Psi, also called "Phi Psi", is an American collegiate social fraternity founded at Jefferson College in Canonsburg, Pennsylvania, on February 19, 1852. There are over a hundred chapters and colonies at accredited four year colleges and universities throughout the United States. More than 112,000 members have been initiated into Phi Kappa Psi since its founding.

The supreme governing body of the Phi Kappa Psi fraternity is the Grand Arch Council (G.A.C.). The first convened in 1855. G.A.C.s then convened at an irregular schedule until an entirely new form of government was ratified in 1886. Beginning in 1888, nearly all G.A.C.s have been regularly scheduled and have occurred biennially with two exceptions; those being that of the 1944 G.A.C. which was cancelled due to World War II, and the 2020 G.A.C. which was cancelled due to the Coronavirus Pandemic.



Grand Arch Councils

Footnotes

References

Books

Periodicals

External links

Phi Kappa Psi's official web site

Grand Arch Councils
Lists of fraternity and sorority national conferences